Francisco Félix de Souza (4 October 1754 – 8 May 1849) was a Brazilian slave trader who was deeply influential in the regional politics of pre-colonial West Africa (namely, current-day Nigeria, Benin, Ghana and Togo). He founded Afro-Brazilian communities in areas that are now part of those countries, and went on to become the "chachá" of Ouidah (the slave trading hub for the region), a title that conferred no official powers but commanded local respect in the Kingdom of Dahomey, where, after being jailed by King Adandozan of Dahomey, he helped Ghezo ascend the throne in a coup d'état. He became chacha to the new king, a curious phrase that has been explained as originating from his saying "(...) já, já.", a Portuguese phrase meaning something will be done right away.

His early years in Africa are well documented in a long article (in Portuguese) by Alberto Costa e Silva entitled "The Early Years of Francisco Féliz de Souza on the Slave Coast".

Francisco Félix de Souza was a major slave trader and merchant who traded in palm oil, gold and slaves. He migrated from Brazil to what is now the African republic of Benin. He has been called "the greatest slave trader".

Trading slaves from what was then the Dahomey region, he was known for his extravagance and was reputed to have had at least 80 children with women in his harem. De Souza continued to market slaves after the trade was abolished in most jurisdictions. He was apparently so trusted by the locals in Dahomey that he was awarded the status of a chieftain." Although a Catholic, he practiced the Vodun religion, and had his own family shrine. He was buried in Dahomey.

Family and legacy

De Souza is regarded as the "father" of the city of Ouidah. The city has a statue of De Souza, a plaza named after De Souza, and a museum dedicated to the De Souza family.

According to Edna Bay, De Souza was "deeply influential as an intermediary between European and African cultures". Today he is known as a founding patriarch of the Afro-Brazilian communities in Ghana, Togo, Benin and Nigeria. The de Souza family has been very instrumental in fighting for the independence of Togo, Ghana, Nigeria and Benin. Figures like 
Paul-Emile de Souza, a president of Benin, and Chantal de Souza Boni Yayi, a former first lady of Benin, typify the class.

According to the de Souza family, Francisco Félix de Souza was the eighth generation descendant of Tomé de Souza (1503–1579), a Portuguese nobleman who was the first governor-general of the Portuguese colony of Brazil from 1549 to 1553. If true, it would make the contemporary de Souzas members of the Portuguese nobility in addition to being an African chieftaincy family.

The protagonist of Bruce Chatwin's novel The Viceroy of Ouidah is said to be based upon the life of Francisco Félix de Souza.

References

General
 
 

1754 births
1849 deaths
People from Salvador, Bahia
Brazilian people of Portuguese descent
Brazilian people of indigenous peoples descent
Brazilian Roman Catholics
Brazilian emigrants to Benin
People from Ouidah
Beninese people of Portuguese descent
Brazilian occultists
Voodoo practitioners
Portuguese slave traders
African slave traders
18th-century Portuguese businesspeople
19th-century Brazilian businesspeople